A War of Children is a 1972 television film directed by George Schaefer, written by James Costigan, and starring Vivien Merchant, Jenny Agutter, and John Ronane.

Premise
During The Troubles in Northern Ireland, two middle-class families in Belfast, one Catholic and one Protestant, turn from friends to bitter enemies. Their children face the painful consequences.

Cast
 Vivien Merchant as Nora Tomelty
 Jenny Agutter as Maureen Tomelty
 John Ronane as Frank Tomelty
 Danny Figgis as Donal Tomelty
 Anthony Andrews as Reg Hogg
 Aideen O'Kelly as Meg McCullum
 David G. Meredith as Robbie McCullum
 Oliver Maguire as Ian McCullum
 Patrick Dawson as Seamus Lynch

Awards
The film won the Primetime Emmy Award for Outstanding Single Program - Drama or Comedy and was nominated for Outstanding Directorial Achievement in Drama - A Single Program. It was also nominated for the Golden Globe Award for Best Television Film.

References

External links
 A War of Children in the Internet Movie Database

1972 television films
1972 films
CBS network films
Films directed by George Schaefer
Films set in Northern Ireland
Films about the Irish Republican Army
Films about The Troubles (Northern Ireland)
Films set in Belfast
1970s English-language films